Communal elections were held in Cambodia on 1 April 2007.

Results

References

Communal elections in Cambodia
2007 in Cambodia
Cambodia